Look Both Ways is a 2022 American romantic comedy drama film directed by Wanuri Kahiu and written by April Prosser. It stars Lili Reinhart, Luke Wilson, Andrea Savage, Aisha Dee, Danny Ramirez, David Corenswet, and Nia Long. The film was released on August 17, 2022, on Netflix.

Plot 
During her senior year at the University of Texas, Natalie has sex with her friend Gabe, with both agreeing not to "make it a big deal". A few weeks later, on the night of their graduation, Natalie feels sick and her best friend Cara gets her pregnancy tests. When Natalie takes them, her life diverges into two parallel realities based on the result.

In the reality where Natalie's test is positive, she moves back home with her mom and dad, who are less than thrilled and unimpressed with Gabe's status as an aspiring musician. They encourage Natalie to still pursue her dream career in animation while she struggles with the realization that she will become a mother.

In the reality where her test is negative, she moves to Los Angeles with Cara and they start building their careers. Natalie applies to be an assistant to animator Lucy Galloway. After pining for the job, she gets an offer, and forms a strong bond with her colleague Jake. They encourage each other to follow their dreams, with him desiring to be a successful movie producer.

In the pregnancy reality, Natalie and Gabe struggle to coparent as their daughter Rosie is born. He wants them to move in with him, but Natalie does not agree and tells him to date, though later she appears regretful about her decision in a conversation with Cara. Gabe begins a relationship with a woman named Miranda, making Natalie uncomfortable. When Natalie visits Cara and her girlfriend in LA, she gets a call from Rosie who says she is left overnight with a stranger. Natalie rushes back, much to Cara's disappointment, and finds out that Gabe has proposed to Miranda. Natalie throws herself into her artwork.

In the other reality where her test came negative, Natalie and Jake develop a strong romantic relationship and consider moving in together. That is, until Jake receives a year-long job producing in Nova Scotia. They try long distance, but Natalie finds it isn’t working for her as Jake is always busy with work. Natalie shows Lucy her portfolio, and is given some very critical notes, saying her work is unoriginal. She encourages her to quit to find her voice, so she does. She returns home to a friend’s baby shower with Cara, feeling like a failure.

In both realities, Natalie has a career breakthrough. She gets accepted to the South by Southwest film festival in Austin where in one reality, she sits on a panel of creators including Lucy and discusses a comic inspired by Rosie, and in the other, her short film is showcased.

In the negative pregnancy test reality, Nat sees Gabe’s band in a bar, catching up with him after five years. Later on, she is surprised that Jake has traveled to see her short film, despite risking his job with the movie. Lucy sees Natalie’s short film and encourages her to reconnect when she returns to Los Angeles.

In the positive pregnancy test reality, Natalie and Rosie also watch Gabe's band perform at a bar. Afterwards, she asks him why Miranda isn't at the gig. Gabe tells her that he broke off the engagement because he is in love with her, not Miranda.

In one reality, Jake and Natalie walk through the streets, happy to be reunited. In the other, Gabe and Natalie have a serious conversation about how they would like to develop their relationship. Both realities converge when each of the couples walk past Natalie’s sorority house, where she took the pregnancy test. In both realities, Natalie walks up into the bathroom, looks into the mirror, and reassures herself that things worked out before leaving.

Cast 
 Lili Reinhart as Natalie Bennett
 Danny Ramirez as Gabe
 David Corenswet as Jake
 Aisha Dee as Cara
 Andrea Savage as Tina Bennett
 Luke Wilson as Rick Bennett
 Nia Long as Lucy Galloway
 Elisa Annette as Shay Tenzie
 Amanda Knapic as Miranda
 Jacqueline and Francine Seaman as Rosie

Production 
In March 2021, Netflix announced that the film, then known as Plus/Minus, would be led and executive produced by Lili Reinhart. Reinhart was previously an executive producer for Chemical Hearts (2020). In June 2021, Luke Wilson, Andrea Savage, Aisha Dee, Danny Ramirez, and David Corenswet were added the cast. In August 2021, Nia Long joined the cast.

Principal photography began on June 21, 2021, and wrapped on August 8, 2021 in Austin, Texas. Filming also took place in Los Angeles, California. In early 2022, reshoots for the film were shot at the Vancouver Public Library, Pacific Coffee Roasters, and the Acquafarina restaurant in downtown Vancouver, British Columbia.

The film was released on August 17, 2022, with a runtime of 110 minutes.

Reception
 Metacritic assigned the film a weighted average score of 49 out of 100, based on 11 critics, indicating "mixed or average reviews".

Courtney Howard of Variety said: "While the filmmakers' heads and hearts are in the right place with their resonant sentiments on taking risks and embracing fate, their execution of narrative basics proves lackluster." Reubyn Coutinho of Netflix Junkie wrote: By not nudging the audience toward one particular perspective, it remains true to its own mission statement, i.e. getting people to Look Both Ways.

References

External links 
 

2022 romantic comedy-drama films
Alternate timeline films
American romantic comedy-drama films
English-language Netflix original films
2020s American films
2020s English-language films